Anusha Damayanthi (born February 11, 1978) is an actress in Sri Lankan cinema and television. She started her career in 1996 from Cheriyo Darling and won Dance Stars Dance reality show title in 2011 which was telecast on Swarnavahini.

Theater work
She has acted few stage dramas. Her first stage acting came through Indian Sagare drama directed by Sisil Gunasekara. She then acted on Vaniciye Twinsla, and Dancing Super Star.

Television
She contested for the reality dance program Dance Stars Dance and won the competition.

Filmography

References

External links 

අනූෂා දමයන්ති ගේ ළමාවිය අම්මා - අයිරාංගනී ගුණතිලක හෙළි කරයි

Living people
Sinhalese actresses
Sri Lankan film actresses
20th-century Sri Lankan actresses
21st-century Sri Lankan actresses
Sri Lankan television actresses
1977 births